Maria Adelaide Amaral (born 1 July 1942, in Alfena) is a Portuguese Brazilian playwright, screenwriter, and novelist. A good deal of her plays concern disaffected urban professionals. She has been classed as among the two major women playwrights of Brazil, the other being Leilah Assunção.

In 1994, Maria Adelaide Amaral biographed the Brazilian comedian Dercy Gonçalves. The book was titled Dercy de Cabo a Rabo. In 2012, Amaral adapted this book into the miniseries Dercy de Verdade.

Despite her work as writer, she is perhaps best known to the public as an author of telenovelas, including the 2010 remake of Ti Ti Ti.

References

External links 

Brazilian people of Portuguese descent
Brazilian women dramatists and playwrights
1942 births
Living people
Authors of Brazilian telenovelas
Brazilian women screenwriters
Women soap opera writers
20th-century Brazilian dramatists and playwrights
20th-century Brazilian women writers
21st-century Brazilian dramatists and playwrights
21st-century Brazilian women writers